Damion Delano Stewart (born 18 August 1980) is a Jamaican professional footballer who last played for Perlis FA in the Malaysia Premier League.

Club career

Harbour View FC
Stewart played for Jamaica side Harbour View FC where he garnered the nickname "Stew Peas". While playing as defensive stalwart at Harbour View, his club won the Jamaica National Premier League in 2000 and CFU Club Championship in 2004. In February 2005, he had a trial with Darlington, following which he was due to sign for the rest of the 2004–05, until his move was blocked by the Home Office.

Bradford City
He returned to England in the summer with Bradford City and signed a season long loan for the 2005–06 season. He made his Bradford debut as a half-time substitute in a 2–0 defeat to Southend United on 9 August 2005. His first start came on 12 November 2005 when he was substituted after just 27 minutes. He scored his first goal in a 1–0 victory over AFC Bournemouth to help ease Bradford's relegation worries. In total, he played 23 league games during his loan spell as Bradford came 11th in League One.

Queens Park Rangers
Bradford manager Colin Todd had hoped to keep Stewart on, but his form earned him a six-figure transfer to Championship side Queens Park Rangers. After a shaky start to life in the Championship, Stewart hit form after the arrival of Danny Cullip from Nottingham Forest. He soon cemented his place in the Queens Park Rangers side and played more than 80 games in the 2006–07 and 2007–08 seasons. In the 2007–08 season, Stewart scored five goals, but was also sent off twice. He memorably scored the only goal as QPR knocked Aston Villa out of the 2008–09 League Cup with a 1–0 victory at Villa Park.

Bristol City
He joined Bristol City on a three-year contract, in July 2010, for an undisclosed fee. He made his Championship debut for City against Millwall on 7 August and was booked twice, resulting in a red card. He scored his first goal against Doncaster a week later. He was released on 31 August 2012.

Loan to Notts County
On 5 January 2012, Damion joined Notts County on a loan until the end of the season.

Notts County
Damion signed a short-term contract with Notts County on 2 November 2012.

Pahang FA
On 5 April 2013, Pahang FA confirmed that had secured the services of 32-year-old Jamaican defender, Damion Stewart. The former Notts County and Queens Park Rangers player was impressive in friendly matches against Police PDRM FA and Kuala Lumpur at the Temerloh Stadium. The lanky Stewart, who has 55 caps, has great leadership qualities and formed a formidable partnership with Jalaluddin Jaafar, Zaiza 'The Lord' Zainal Abidin, Razman Roslan and Saiful Nizam Miswan in defence. On 3 November 2013, Stewart assisted Pahang to win the Malaysian Cup, which the last time Pahang did it was 21 years ago (1992).

Perlis FA
After a successful time with Pahang FA, Stewart was confirmed by Perlis FA coach, Dollah Salleh on July that he was signed by the team during the second transfer window to strengthen the team in order to face the remaining matches in the 2016 Malaysia Premier League. In July 2017, he was released from Perlis FA.

International career
Stewart played for the Jamaica Under-20 and Under-23 youth national teams. He made his international debut for Jamaica National Football Team in 1999 against Ghana. He has played in the 2003, 2005, and 2009 CONCACAF Gold Cups and numerous World Cup qualification matches since his senior team debut.

Managerial career
In 2019, Stewart was named head coach of Harbour View FC.

Honours

Club
Jamaica National Premier League:
 Winners (1): 2000
JFF Champions Cup:
 Winners (2): 2001, 2002
 Runner-up (2): 2003, 2005
Malaysia Cup: 2
 Winners (2): 2013, 2014
Malaysia FA Cup: 1
 Winners (1): 2014
 Malaysia Charity Shield
 Winners (1): 2014

International
CFU Club Championship:
 Winners (1): 2004

References

External links
Stewart sedia 'layan' serangan TRW
Stewart tak sabar aksi final
PBNP sasar 32,000 tiket dijual
Top 5 Foreign Signings of the MSL
Stewart mahu Pahang menang di Shah Alam
 Stewart yakin ke final
New signings Conti and Stewart inspire Pahang to win over Felda
Conti, Stewart tipped to boost Pahang title bid
Pahang turn to Stewart
Damion Stewart player profile at qpr.co.uk

1980 births
Living people
Association football defenders
Jamaican footballers
Jamaica international footballers
Jamaican expatriate footballers
Jamaican expatriate sportspeople in Malaysia
Harbour View F.C. players
Expatriate footballers in England
Expatriate footballers in Malaysia
Bradford City A.F.C. players
Queens Park Rangers F.C. players
Bristol City F.C. players
Notts County F.C. players
Sri Pahang FC players
Perlis FA players
2003 CONCACAF Gold Cup players
2005 CONCACAF Gold Cup players
2009 CONCACAF Gold Cup players
English Football League players